The Borås Ladies Open was a women's professional golf tournament on the Swedish Golf Tour and LET Access Series played between 2015 and 2016 in Borås, Sweden.

Borås Golf Club hosted its first LET/LETAS event in 2015, after the club was slated to host the Borås European Masters on the 1987 Ladies European Tour but the event got stricken from the schedule.

In 2015 Olivia Cowan won her second title of the season here, on her way to top the LETAS Order of Merit. In 2016 Josephine Janson recorded a wire-to-wire win for her first professional title.

Winners

References

External links

LET Access Series events
Swedish Golf Tour (women) events
Golf tournaments in Sweden